The Rock 'n' Roll Camp for Girls is both the original Rock n Roll Camp for Girls non-profit organization based in Portland, Oregon, United States, and the common name associated with the Girls Rock Camp movement of youth organizations for girls inspired by the original camp in Portland.  The camp in Portland gives girls ages 8–18 the opportunity to learn rock instruments, form bands, write songs, and perform. The mostly volunteer and female staff strives to inspire self-esteem and mutual support among diverse campers within this rock band framework.  The first camp was held in August 2001.

The camp grew out of founder Misty McElroy's 2000 project as a women's studies major at Portland State University.

Inspired by the work from the original Portland project, there are now Girls Rock Camps all over the globe. The mission of the Rock n Roll Camp for Girls has become a DIY global movement that seeks to empower girls through music. Girls Rock Camps now take place in more than 40 American cities including New York (Willie Mae Rock Camp for Girls), Austin, Texas (Girls Rock Austin),  Charlotte, North Carolina (Girls Rock CLT), Atlanta, Georgia (Girls Rock Camp ATL), Las Vegas, Nevada (Girls Rock, Las Vegas), Washington, DC, (Girls Rock, DC), Philadelphia, Pennsylvania (Girls Rock! Philly),  Seattle, Washington (Rain City Rock Camp),  Indianapolis, Indiana (Girls Rock! Indianapolis), Los Angeles, California (Rock n Roll Camp for Girls, Los Angeles),  Athens, Ohio (Athens Girls Rock Camp), and Oklahoma City, Oklahoma (Rock 'n Roll Camp for Girls, OKC) and globally in places like Dubai (Rock Camp for Girls, UAE), Germany (Ruby Tuesday Berlin), Brazil (Girls Rock Camp Brasil), Canada (many, see below table for locations), Sweden (Popkollo), Finland (Girls Rock! Finland) and Australia (Girls Rock! Australia).  Each camp is independently run, but organizers exchange ideas and share approaches by way of the international Girls Rock Camp Alliance.

Camps around the globe
The Rock n Roll Camp for Girls mission is expanding as people become inspired to start chapters in their hometowns all over the world. Each camp is put together by the community it represents, and because of this many camps offer different versions of similar programming.

Girls rock camp alliance
The Girls Rock Camp Alliance (GRCA) is an alliance of music camps who share the same mission of empowerment through music. The purpose of the GRCA is to create a physical and a virtual space for camps to share ideas and resources, as well as a space for organizers of camps to meet in person and gain inspiration from each other.
The GRCA holds one conference a year where organizers from individual camps gather to skill build, resource share, build community, and talk about different camp philosophies as well as movement building.

Girls rock camp in culture and media
In 2006, the Rock n Roll Camp for Girls was the subject of Stacy Lynn Singer's dissertation at Georgia State University, entitled I'm Not Loud Enough to be Heard, Rock n Roll Camp for Girls, and Feminist Quests for Equity, Community, and Cultural Production.
In 2008, Girls Rock! was released. It is a documentary that follows the stories of three young girls through their week at the Rock n Roll Camp for Girls in Portland, Oregon.
Also in 2008, a book was written by the Rock n Roll Camp for Girls to encourage girls to play music, which featured illustrations by Graphic Artist Nicole Georges. This book contained a short history of women in rock music, and featured contributions from former volunteers of camps such as Nicole Georges, STS, Carrie Brownstein (Portlandia/Sleater Kinney) and members of The Gossip.
In 2012, the documentary Hit So Hard (about drummer Patty Schemel from the band Hole) featured a portion about the Rock n Roll Camp for Girls.

Other programs
Many Girls Rock Camps offer programs other than a summer camp, but with the same ideology. Programs that are offered by some Girls Rock Camps include but are not limited to: Ladies Rock Camps, after school programs, and special events.
Ladies Rock Camp (or in some places Womens Rock Camp) is usually a 2-3 day program where adult women are exposed to similar workshops and musical instrument instruction that girls receive during summer camp.
After school programs differ depending on the location, but range from totally music driven programming to community and school focused programs.
Many Girls Rock Camps offer special events during the year ranging from movie nights to concerts.

Queer Rock Camp in Olympia, Washington, is a week long summer camp program for queer youth ages 12–21 that was inspired by the Rock n Roll Camp for Girls program. Like Girls Rock Camps, they seek to empower queer youth through music, creativity, expression, and workshops that aim to foster those goals.

See also 
 Girls Rock!, a documentary film about the Rock and Roll Camp for Girls

References

External links 
 Official web site
 Girls Rock Camp Alliance members
 Girls Rock Camp in Toronto
 Girls Rock Camp in Vancouver, Canada
 Girls Rock Camp in Sweden
 Girls Rock Camp in France
 Girls Rock Camp Organisation in Australia
 Girls Rock Camp in Brisbane, Australia
 Girls Rock! Camp in Aotearoa
 Yukon Girls Rock Camp, Whitehorse and Dawson City in Yukon, Canada

Organizations based in Portland, Oregon
Culture of Portland, Oregon
Music organizations based in the United States
Summer camps in Oregon
Feminist organizations in the United States
History of women in Oregon